Dinky Dungeons is a role-playing game published by Doc's Games in 1985.

Description
Dinky Dungeons is the smallest role-playing game ever produced. The very concise rules cover character creation, classes, skills, spells, combat, experience, monsters, and a two-page introductory mini-scenario. The game includes a GM's screen, a hex map, and a sample character sheet.

The game utilized six-sided dice (d6 in game parlance). Each character had two attributes, Mental and Physical. There were three classes – fighter, wizard, and bard – and three optional non-human races – elves, dwarves, and "Fuzzy-Winkers", the latter of which being intelligent, giant rats. The Physical trait governed the size of weapon the fighter could use, which in turn determined how much damage the character could do on a good roll. Mental governed a wizard or bard's spell points and the number of spells they had at their disposal.

Conflict resolution was handled by rolling 2d6 and trying to get X or less, where X was the difficulty of a task set by the GM or by a chart that compared the attacker and defender's relative abilities. Where abilities were matched, the player needed to roll a 7 or less for his or her character to succeed. 

Rights to the game currently reside with the illustrator, Phil Morrissey, who is planning on a re-release.

Publication history
Dinky Dungeons was designed by Denton R. Elliott and published by Doc's Games in 1985 as a 32-page book, a cardstock screen, a cardstock sheet, a character sheet, a map, and dice.

Reception

References

Fantasy role-playing games
Role-playing games introduced in 1985